Hongling South station is a Metro station of Shenzhen Metro Line 9. It opened on 28 October 2016. This station is located under the southeast of the intersection of Hongling South Road and Shennan East Road. The station is an indirect interchange with Line 1 and Line 2 at Grand Theater Station.

Station layout

Exits

References

Shenzhen Metro stations
Railway stations in Guangdong
Futian District
Luohu District
Railway stations in China opened in 2016